Adrian Văsâi (also known as Adrian Văsîi; born 9 September 1964) is a Romanian former footballer and currently the manager of Romania national under-17 football team. 

As a footballer, Văsâi grew up in the academy of Sportul Studențesc, club for which he made his debut in the top-flight in 1983. Subsequently, Văsâi moved to Inter Sibiu where he spent the most important part of his career, playing in 212 matches and scoring 70 goals. He also had a short spells in the Süper Lig at Vanspor and in Nemzeti Bajnokság I at Nyíregyháza Spartacus, before ending his career at Jiul Petroșani.

As a manager, Văsâi started his career at Inter Sibiu, where he was the last manager in the club's history, subsequently being in charge of IS Câmpia Turzii (achieving the round of 16 in the 2002–03 Cupa României) and Liberty Salonta (contributing to a successful promotion campaign to Liga I). Since 2007, Văsâi is an employee of the Romanian Football Federation, time in which he was the manager of U15, U16, U17 and U19 national squads, as well as the coordinator of the Timișoara National Training Center (CNP Timișoara).

Honours

Player
Inter Sibiu
Divizia B: Winner (1) 1987–88
Balkans Cup: Winner (1) 1990–91

Jiul Petroșani
Divizia B: Winner (1) 1995–96

Manager
Liberty Salonta
Divizia B: Winner (1) 2005–06

References

External links
 
 
 Adrian Văsâi at tff.org

1964 births
Living people
Footballers from Bucharest
Romanian footballers
Association football forwards
Liga I players
Liga II players
Nemzeti Bajnokság I players
Süper Lig players
FC Inter Sibiu players
FC Sportul Studențesc București players
Nyíregyháza Spartacus FC players
Vanspor footballers
CSM Jiul Petroșani players
Romanian football managers
FC Inter Sibiu managers
Romanian expatriate footballers
Expatriate footballers in Turkey
Romanian expatriate sportspeople in Turkey
Expatriate footballers in Hungary
Romanian expatriate sportspeople in Hungary